Omar Sharif on Bridge is a 1992 video game published by Interplay Productions.

Gameplay
Omar Sharif on Bridge is a game in which contract bridge is played with advice from actor Omar Sharif. Players access the menu options using a hotkey combination. The game focuses on both teaching and playing bridge. The digitized voice of Omar Sharif narrates the gameplay. The computer will give hints to players who are not sure how to bid.

Reception
Johnny L. Wilson reviewed the game for Computer Gaming World, and stated that "Omar Sharif On Bridge is so easy to get into, challenging to play and well-designed in terms of interface that it is likely to become a permanent resident on our hard disks."

Tony Dillon for CU Amiga called it "an excellent package for the beginner" but warned that users would "grow out of it quickly" and rated it 74%.

Christina Erskine for PC Review rated the game 6 stars out of 10 and praised the game's "attractive presentation" and its options, saying it scored well as a package for beginners.

Richard C. Leinecker for Compute! recommended the game to serious bridge players having trouble finding opponents to play with or needing practice, stating "You'll face a reasonably good opponent, and you can get advice and learn more about the game."

John Sweeney for Page 6 called the game "a pretty good buy" for the average bridge player.

Reviews
Amiga Format - Sep, 1992
Computer Gaming World - Mar, 1993
Amiga Joker

References

1992 video games
Acorn Archimedes games
Amiga games
Atari ST games
Contract bridge mass media
Digital card games
DOS games
Interplay Entertainment games
Single-player video games
Strategy video games
Video games based on real people
Windows games